Silent Hill f is an upcoming survival horror video game developed by NeoBards Entertainment and published by Konami. Silent Hill f is  the ninth mainline game in the Silent Hill franchise and the first mainline title in the franchise in over a decade. Unlike previous games in the series, it is not being set in the titular town, but in 1960s rural Japan.

Development
In February 2021, it was reported that Konami was planning to revive the Silent Hill franchise with multiple third-party studios developing new games. In October 2022, Konami announced four new Silent Hill projects, 10 years after the last mainline Silent Hill game, Downpour. Konami has revealed that Silent Hill f is developed by Taiwanese video game studio NeoBards Entertainment. 

The game is being directed by Al Yang, studio creative director of NeoBards Entertainment, with the game being written by Ryukishi07. Creatures and characters are being designed by Japanese artist Kera, with the game being produced by Motoi Okamoto, former Nintendo producer.

References

Upcoming video games
Psychological horror games
Silent Hill games
Video games developed in Taiwan
Video games set in Japan
Video games set in the 1960s